Stjør- and Verdal District Court was a district court in Nord-Trøndelag county, Norway. The court was based in the town of Levanger. The court existed from 1635 until 2011. It had jurisdiction over the municipalities of Levanger, Stjørdal, Verdal, Frosta, Leksvik and Meråker. Cases from this court could be appealed to Frostating Court of Appeal. In the  court, there work three professional judges, two deputy judges and seven clerks. In 2006, the court dealt with 158 criminal cases, 381 summary procedures and 104 civil cases. 

The court was a court of first instance. Its judicial duties were mainly to settle criminal cases and to resolve civil litigation as well as bankruptcy. The administration and registration tasks of the court included death registration, issuing certain certificates, performing duties of a notary public, and officiating civil wedding ceremonies. Cases from this court were heard by a combination of professional judges and lay judges.

History
This court was established in 1591. On 1 January 2011 this court was merged with the Inderøy District Court to form the new Inntrøndelag District Court which was based in Steinkjer.

References

Defunct district courts of Norway
Organisations based in Levanger
1591 establishments in Norway
2010 disestablishments in Norway
Courts and tribunals established in 1591
Courts and tribunals disestablished in 2010